Gözde Kaya (born 7 November 1988) is a Turkish actress.

Life and career
Gözde Kaya was born on 7 November 1988 in Antalya, Turkey. Her sister is actress. She graduated from United Arts Department of Yıldız Technical University. Then she graduated from Musical Theatre Department of Istanbul University. Kaya stepped into her career through photographer Nihat Odabaşı whom she met on a restaurant in İzmir.

In 2011, she started her acting career, her first series was Kalbimin Seni Seçti on which she depicted the character of İpek, it starred Sermiyan Midyat, İdil Fırat and Ezgi Eyüboğlu. In 2012, she made her debut in the series Uçurum and portrayed the character of Masha. In 2013, she appeared in the series Benim Hala Umudum Var. Simultaneously in 2014, she appeared in series Gölgedekiler and Sil Baştan and portrayed the character of Maya. In 2015, she appeared in their series Çilek Kokusu and portrayed the character of Çağla, it starred Demet Özdemir and Yusuf Çim as the leading characters.

In 2017, she appeared in the historical fiction series Payitaht: Abdülhamid and portrayed the character of Hatice Sultan, the daughter of Ottoman Sultan Murad V and Şayan Kadın. In 2019, she made her beaut in the series Vuslat and depicted the character of Sultan Korkmazer. In 2017, she appeared in crime, drama, love series Ramo and portrayed the character of Nadya, the darling of the character of Cihangir. After "Payitaht Abdülhamid", she is playing in series "Senden Daha Güzel" with Cemre Baysel for twice.

Filmography
Television

Film

Awards

References

External links

1988 births
Living people
Turkish television actresses
21st-century Turkish actresses